Boettgerilla compressa is a species of air-breathing land slug, a terrestrial pulmonate gastropod mollusk in the family Boettgerillidae.

Boettgerilla compressa is the type species of the genus Boettgerilla.

Distribution 
The type locality of Boettgerilla compressa is Tsebelda, Abkhazia. Another known locality is the environs of the Bagrati Cathedral near Kutaisi in Georgia.

Description 
The body of this slug is narrow. The slug has a length of about 2 cm.

References 

Boettgerillidae
Gastropods described in 1910